is a Japanese actor and voice actor who is affiliated with Himawari Theatre Group.

Biography

Filmography

Films

Voice Roles

Television Anime
Cyborg 009 The Cyborg Soldier (2001) – Mel (Episode 28)
Kino's Journey (2003) – Threesome
Aishiteruze Baby (2004) – Shōta Nashiya
Capeta (2005) – Isamu Tobita (Elementary School)
Michiko to Hatchin (2008) – Gonzales
Yu-Gi-Oh! 5Ds (2008) – Marco
Re-Main (2021) – Kōki Toguchi

Anime films
Colorful (2010) – Classmate

Dubbing roles

Live-action

Stand by Me – Teddy Duchamp (Corey Feldman) (2019 Blu-ray version)

Animation

Guillermo del Toro's Pinocchio - Candlewick

References

External links
 

1992 births
Living people
Japanese male child actors
Japanese male video game actors
Japanese male voice actors
Male voice actors from Kagoshima Prefecture
Ryukyuan people